Linda Thompson is an Australian operatic soprano, producer and stage director.  Thompson performed 25 principal operatic roles, including two world premieres at the Sydney Opera House, with The Australian Opera. Thompson was Head of Classical Voice department at the Faculty of Arts (Music) at Monash University from 2001-2008, before founding the Opera Studio Melbourne (now Australian Contemporary Opera Company) in 2008. In 2015, Thompson founded Australia's only regional international opera festival, held annually in the Yarra Valley since 2017.

Career 
Thompson began her professional performing career co-producing and starring in a 1990 production of Malcolm Williamson’s The Growing Castle directed by Barrie Kosky, followed by Kosky's staged version of Handel’s Belshazaar in the role of Nitocris, for which Thompson received a Green Room Award nomination for Best Female Principal Artist in Opera. Thompson joined the Victoria State Opera as a Young Artist in 1990, and moved to Sydney to join The Australian Opera in 1991. Thompson created the principal soprano roles in two world premieres of new Australian operas:  Clare Clairmont in Mer de Glace, with music Richard Meale and libretto by David Malouf. The production was directed by Simon Phillips, and premiered at the Sydney Opera House in 1991. In 1992, Thompson took the leading principal role in Larry Sitsky's The Golem, with libretto by Gwen Harwood. The production was directed by Barrie Kosky, and opened at the Sydney Opera House in1993. Thompson sang Helena in the original cast of Australian director Baz Luhrmann's A Midsummer Night's Dream (Benjamin Britten), designed by Catherine Martin for Opera Australia in 1993.

From 1994, Thompson was sessional lecturer at the Victorian College of the Arts and the Faculty of Music/Conservatorium at the University of Melbourne, then Head of Classical Voice at Monash University from 2001-2008, where she founded the Monash Opera Ensemble.  In late 2008, Thompson founded The Opera Studio Melbourne (no)w Gertrude Opera) as a repertory opera company for the development of young opera artists and as a vehicle for contemporary opera production. In 2013, Thompson re-joined Opera Australia as a freelance principal soprano, covering the role of Sieglinde in Die Walküre and Dritte Norn in Götterdammerung, as part of the company's first Wagner Der Ring das Nibelungen (Ring Cycle) in Melbourne.

Since 2009, as Artistic Director and CEO of Gertrude Opera, Thompson has produced more than 12 Australian premiere productions, 40 new opera productions, and provided a performance platform for 120 young operatic artists. Thompson is Founder/Artistic Director of Australia's only international opera festival - in Nagambie Lakes (2015-2016) and Yarra Valley (2017-2019).

Awards and achievements 
In October 2022, Thompson was inducted into the Victorian Honour Roll of Women - recognition for women who have demonstrated remarkable leadership and excellence in their field of expertise. 

Thompson received Opera Chaser Awards for 'Outstanding Director' and 'Outstanding Production' by an Independent Company for the Australian premiere season of The Handmaid’s Tale  by Danish composer Sir Poul Ruders, with libretto by Paul Bentley (UK), at the Yarra Valley Opera Festival in 2018. Thompson followed up with the OperaChaser Award for 'Outstanding Production' by an Independent Company for The Enchanted Pig directed by Gale Edwards AM with costume design by Oscar-winner Tim Chappel at Gertrude Opera's Yarra Valley Opera Festival in 2019.

Thompson researched Australian Art Song, culminating in the release of Repose - Lullabies and Cradle Songs by Australian Composers on the MOVE Records Label in 1999. In February 2001, Thompson was appointed Head of Classical Voice at Monash University. In 2001, she created the Monash Opera Ensemble, and in 2008 founded The Opera Studio Melbourne (now Australian Contemporary Opera Company).

Thompson was winner of Herald Sun Aria Competition (1990), the Dame Mabel Brookes Fellowship (1990) and Lady Persia Galleghan Award (1990) - Opera Foundation Australia, Victorian winner of the ABC Instrumental and Vocal Competition, and Runner-up in the Metropolitan Opera Auditions Regional Final.  In 1989, Thompson received a Green Room Award nomination for Principal Soprano (Nitocris, Handel's Belshazzar - Treason of Images Company).

Selected works 
A selection of the works that Thompson has premiered in Australia, as producer, director and/or performer:

Discography

References

External links 
 Gertrude Opera website

Year of birth missing (living people)
Living people
Australian women
Australian opera directors
Opera managers
University of Melbourne alumni
Australian sopranos